Detroit Deli (A Taste of Detroit) is the fourth studio album by American hip hop group Slum Village, released on June 29, 2004.  It was released shortly after Baatin left the group, leaving only T3 and Elzhi.

Overview 
After Baatin's departure from Slum Village, there was a lot of pressure upon the group to deliver a solid follow up to their previous album, Trinity.  The first single from Detroit Deli was "Selfish", produced by and featuring Kanye West, with John Legend providing vocals during the chorus.  The song was a moderate hit and the group's highest charting single, partly as a result of Kanye West's mainstream popularity. The album received a fairly solid reception, but further promotion from Capitol Records stopped short of a second single or video.  Some of their longtime fans viewed the collaboration with West as a ploy for mainstream attention.  The group would acknowledge this somewhat, on their following album, simply titled Slum Village, in 2005.

The song "Reunion", was originally supposed to feature all four members of Slum Village, but Baatin was absent from the final version.

Three of the guests on this album have died in the time since its release; MC Breed, Ol' Dirty Bastard, and J Dilla. On July 31, 2009, Baatin died.

Track listing

Album singles

References 

2004 albums
Slum Village albums
Albums produced by Kanye West
Albums produced by J Dilla
Albums produced by Black Milk